Kindamba is a district in the Pool Region of southern Republic of the Congo. The capital lies at Kindamba.

Towns and villages

Pool Department
Districts of the Republic of the Congo